Victoria Park is a area of Bournemouth, Dorset. The area is south of Moordown, north-west of Winton and east of Talbot Village, Wallisdown and Ensbury Park.

History 
In 2020, an Experimental Traffic Regulation Order (ETRO) was created on Victoria Park Road in order to create a Low Traffic Neighbourhood in Victoria Park.

Facilities 
Victoria Park has a Methodist Church and is residence of the Victoria Park Football Ground, the home of Bournemouth F.C.

Politics 

Victoria Park is part of the Bournemouth West constituency, and is part of the Wallisdown and Winton West ward for elections to Bournemouth, Christchurch and Poole Council.

References 

Areas of Bournemouth
Bournemouth, Christchurch and Poole